David Austen is a former English cricketer.

Austen represented the Northamptonshire Cricket Board in a single List A match against Northumberland in the 2000 NatWest Trophy.

References

External links
David Austen at Cricinfo
David Austen at CricketArchive

Living people
English cricketers
Northamptonshire Cricket Board cricketers
Year of birth missing (living people)